Yerba Buena Center for the Arts (YBCA) is a multi-disciplinary contemporary arts center in San Francisco, California, United States. Located in Yerba Buena Gardens, YBCA features visual art, performance, and film/video that celebrates local, national, and international artists and the Bay Area's diverse communities. YBCA programs year-round in two landmark buildings—the Galleries and Forum by Japanese architect Fumihiko Maki and the adjacent Theater by American architect James Stewart Polshek and Todd Schliemann. Betti-Sue Hertz served as Curator from 2008 through 2015.

History 
The museum was conceived as part of a deal by mayor George Moscone with developers to "set aside land and funds for cultural institutions such as museums, exhibits, and theaters" for the redevelopment projects in South of Market, San Francisco. The museum was opened in 1993.

The YBCA partnered with San Francisco Arts Commission, San Francisco Grants for the Arts, and the San Francisco Human Rights Commission to launch a guaranteed income program in March 2021. The pilot program would give $1,000 a month to 130 artists below certain income levels for six months, beginning in May 2021. It is paid through the Arts Impact Endowment established by Proposition E in 2018, which allocates 1.5% of the city's hotel tax to arts and cultural services. This follows similar programs in Stockton, Oakland, and Marin County to support artists during the COVID-19 pandemic in the United States.

Music
Yerba Buena Center for the Arts embraces many musical genres and styles. Not only does the center provide a stage for Bay Area instrumental and vocal musicians and ensembles, it also offers a sampling of musical practices from all over the world. Along with solo performances, YBCA also has invited various musical projects to use its facilities, such as the tribute to composer Elliott Carter in 2008 and the Long Now Foundation in 2010. The connection between these various musical practices is the intent for social change through education provided by another culture or by creating a community around a purpose. Although month to month there are not many purely musical performances, music is often incorporated with other performing arts, such as dance or theater.

Fine arts
In addition to being a venue for musical performances, YBCA also acts as a non-collecting museum. The various art exhibits YBCA offers emphasize its celebration of both local and world art. For example, in 2008 the art group Royal Art Lodge presented their psychologically surrealist works, challenging the viewer using simple drawings and more pronounced techniques like cutups. YBCA not only holds specific art shows and exhibits but also is carefully aided by various artists in creating particular atmospheres for its spaces. For instance, Instant Coffee, another artist group, designed a lounge room within YBCA for visitors to simply sit and listen to records with a chic atmosphere, while Space 1026 created YBCA's mural, a showcase of social and physical dimensions. The YBCA museum currently has two semi-permanent fine arts exhibitions that will stand until the end of 2017. These exhibitions include Tanis Bruguera's "Talking to Power" and Damon Rich and Jae Shin's "Space Brainz."

Dance
Dance at YBCA includes various forms from many various cultures. In October 2008, Israeli choreographers Inbal Pinto and Avshalom Pollak presented their production of "Shaker" by combining ballet, modern dance, mime, and acrobatic techniques. In addition to more collaborative art forms, YBCA also presents more classical forms of dance, such as ballet. Alonzo King held his company LINES Ballet at YBCA in November 2004, which centered on African American field recordings with various forms of music, narrative, and film playing in the background.

Film/Video

YBCA features all types of cinematic endeavors, including documentaries on a variety of subjects, art-house movies and foreign films. For instance, during the 2009 summer season, it showed documentaries dealing with female masochists (Graphic Sexual Horror), and industrial design (Objectified) while also presenting obscure movie topics, such as its show Winning Isn't Everything: A Tribute to 1970's Sports Film which included the movie The Cheerleaders.

Live events
The center has been the site for product launches by Apple Inc., including iPods and the iPad.

In 2019, it hosted the How I Built This Summit with Guy Raz.

References

External links

Arts centers in California
South of Market, San Francisco
Art museums and galleries in San Francisco
Contemporary art galleries in the United States
Music venues in San Francisco
Parks in San Francisco
Theatres in San Francisco
Museums in San Francisco
Arts organizations based in the San Francisco Bay Area
Non-profit organizations based in San Francisco
Cultural infrastructure completed in 1993
1993 establishments in California
1993 in San Francisco
Fumihiko Maki buildings
Modernist architecture in California